Hugh Rankin may refer to:
 Hugh Doak Rankin (1878–1956), American artist
 Sir Hugh Rankin, 3rd Baronet (1899–1988), British eccentric